Henry Edward Knatchbull (30 August 1808 – 31 August 1876) was an English clergyman and amateur cricketer who played top level matches in the 19th century.

Knatchbull was a son of Sir Edward Knatchbull, 8th Baronet and his third wife Mary Hawkins. He was born in 1808 at Mersham Hatch in Kent and educated at Winchester College. He graduated from Wadham College, Oxford in 1832 and went into the Church of England clergy, initially as a curate at Billingford in Norfolk. In 1833 he was appointed vicar of North Elmham in Norfolk before moving in 1867 to be vicar at Campsea Ashe in Suffolk. He remained at Campsea Ashe until he died there in 1876, aged 68.

He married Pleasance Bagge in 1835. The couple had no children, his wife dying in 1865.

He played first-class cricket for a range of teams, including Oxford University, Kent teams associated amateur Gentlemen of Kent sides and made one appearance for Kent County Cricket Club in 1848. He also played for the Gentlemen against the Players, MCC, Cambridge University and both Norfolk and Suffolk teams. He made his first-class debut in 1827.

References

External links

1808 births
1876 deaths
Henry
English cricketers
English cricketers of 1826 to 1863
Cambridge University cricketers
Gentlemen cricketers
Gentlemen of Kent cricketers
Kent cricketers
Marylebone Cricket Club cricketers
Oxford University cricketers
Suffolk cricketers
Norfolk cricketers
Middlesex cricketers
Non-international England cricketers
Gentlemen of England cricketers
A to K v L to Z cricketers
People from Mersham
Sportspeople from Kent
People educated at Winchester College
Alumni of Wadham College, Oxford
19th-century English Anglican priests